Cheryl Margaret Cran (born August 19, 1963) is a Canadian entrepreneur and author. She is the founder of NextMapping, a Future of Work Consultancy and the CEO of Synthesis at Work Inc. Cran is also the Past President of the Canadian Association of Professional Speakers.

Personal life and education 
Cran was born to David Chouinard and Joanne Hildebrand. She was the lead singer of the rock band Elan.

She is married to Reg Cran and has a daughter and two stepsons.

She is a graduate of Rockhurst University in Communications, Leadership, Communications, and Organizational Development and Exponential Innovation program at Singularity University.

Career 
Cran has been a public speaker for more than 20 years. She is also the Past President of the Global Speakers Federation 2012-2013 and was on the board of directors until 2014.

Cheryl Cran has worked with clients including AT&T, Bell Mobility, Omnitel, Gartner, British Telcomm, and Manulife.

References 

1963 births
Living people
Canadian women non-fiction writers
Rockhurst University alumni
Canadian women chief executives